Gordon James Oakes (22 June 1931 – 15 August 2005) was a British Labour Party politician.

Early life
Oakes was born in Widnes, Cheshire, and was educated at Wade Deacon Grammar School, in Widnes and at Liverpool University. A solicitor by profession, he became a councillor on Widnes Borough Council in 1952, serving as Mayor in 1964.

Parliamentary career
Oakes unsuccessfully contested Bebington in 1959 and Manchester Moss Side at a 1961 by-election.

He served as Member of Parliament (MP) for Bolton West from 1964 to 1970, when he was beaten by the Conservative Robert Redmond by 1,244 votes. He was re-elected for Widnes from a 1971 by-election until 1983, and for Halton from 1983 until 1997.

Oakes served as Parliamentary Private Secretary to the Home Secretary from 1966, and in the government of Harold Wilson as a junior minister and as a Minister of State under James Callaghan. He was made a member of the Privy Council of the United Kingdom in 1979. He left the Opposition front bench in 1983.

He was one of the MPs approached in the 1994 Cash-for-Questions affair, to which he responded "That is not how we do things here".

Personal life and death
Oakes was married to the former Esther O'Neill from 1952 until her death in 1998; they had three sons. He died on 15 August 2005, at the age of 74.

References

External links 
 
 Obituary in The Guardian

1931 births
2005 deaths
21st-century English lawyers
Alumni of the University of Liverpool
Councillors in Cheshire
Deaths from cancer in England
English solicitors
Labour Party (UK) MPs for English constituencies
Members of the Parliament of the United Kingdom for Bolton West
Members of the Privy Council of the United Kingdom
People from Widnes
Place of death missing
Transport and General Workers' Union-sponsored MPs
UK MPs 1964–1966
UK MPs 1966–1970
UK MPs 1970–1974
UK MPs 1974
UK MPs 1974–1979
UK MPs 1979–1983
UK MPs 1983–1987
UK MPs 1987–1992
UK MPs 1992–1997